Jindong Subdistrict is a subdistrict in Jinping District, Shantou, Guangdong, China. , it administers the following 19 residential neighborhoods:
Shiliuyuan
Yuejiyuan
Haitangyuan
Shuixianyuan
Meiguiyuan
Xingyuandong
Xingyuan
Longbei
Dongfu
Baiheyuan
Mudanyuan
Yurong
Nandun
Jinfeng
Beidun
Jinyu
Taoyuan
Jindun
Jinxing

See also 
 List of township-level divisions of Guangdong

References 

Township-level divisions of Guangdong
Shantou